Derbyshire County Cricket Club in 1925 was the cricket season when the English club Derbyshire had been playing for fifty four years. It was their twenty seventh season in the County Championship and they won five matches to finish fourteenth in the County Championship.

1925 season
 
Guy Jackson was in his fourth season as captain. All the club's twenty-four first class matches were in the County Championship. The team recovered from a poor season in the previous year with five wins, but with fewer draws the high number of losses left the team in fourteenth place. Garnet Lee was top scorer in his first season as a first-class player for Derbyshire. Arthur Morton took most wickets with 63.

The most significant addition to the side was Garnet Lee who was to prove a valuable all-rounder over the next few years. Lee had previously played for Nottinghamshire but had taken two seasons at Derbyshire to work himself into the first team. Other players making their debut were Lionel Blaxland who played intermittently over several years Escott Loney and  Wilfred Shardlow who played regularly for three seasons, and Eric Sykes  who played three games in the season and re-appeared in 1932.

Matches

{| class="wikitable" style="width:100%;"
|-
! style="background:#efefef;" colspan="6"| List of  matches
|- style="background:#efefef;"
!No.
!Date
!V
!Result 
!Margin
!Notes
|- 
|1
| 9 May 1925 
| Northamptonshire  County Ground, Derby 
| style="background:#f00;"|Lost
| 35 runs
|  
|- 
|2
|16 May 1925 
| Nottinghamshire    Trent Bridge, Nottingham 
| style="background:#f00;"|Lost
| 10 wickets
|  
|- 
|3
|20 May 1925 
| Yorkshire  Queen's Park, Chesterfield 
| style="background:#f00;"|Lost
| Innings and 160 runs
| Holmes 125; Macaulay 7-13 
|- 
|4
|23 May 1925 
| Somerset County Ground, Derby 
 |bgcolor="#FFCC00"|Drawn
|
| W Bestwick 5-22 
|- 
|5
|30 May 1925 
| Warwickshire Edgbaston, Birmingham 
 |bgcolor="#FFCC00"|Drawn
|
| Stephens 121; GM Lee  119 
|- 
|6
|3 Jun 1925 
|  WorcestershireAmblecote, Stourbridge 
| style="background:#0f0;"|Won
| 212 runs
| Rogers 6-69; Root 5-54 
|- 
|7
|6 Jun 1925 
|  Gloucestershire   Queen's Park, Chesterfield  
| style="background:#f00;"|Lost
| 3 wickets
| Hammond 5-57; J Horsley 6-94; Parker 8-56 
|- 
|8
|10 Jun 1925 
| Essex   County Ground, Leyton 
| style="background:#0f0;"|Won
| 9 wickets
| A Morton 131; BSH Hill-Wood 6-74; J Horsley 6-66 
|- 
|9
|13 Jun 1925 
|  Kent  Angel Ground, Tonbridge  
| style="background:#f00;"|Lost
| Innings and 32 runs
|Seymour 106; Collins 105*; GR Jackson 127; Freeman 6-35 and 5-94
|- 
|10
| 20 Jun 1925 
|  Worcestershire Queen's Park, Chesterfield 
| style="background:#0f0;"|Won
| 6 wickets
| Root 5-92 
|- 
|11
|27 Jun 1925 
|  Kent  County Ground, Derby  
| style="background:#f00;"|Lost
| 5 wickets
| Hardinge 144; Seymour 119; Cornwallis 5-56; J Horsley 5-36 
|- 
|12
| 1 Jul 1925 
| Yorkshire Headingley, Leeds 
| style="background:#f00;"|Lost
| Innings and 159 runs
| Rhodes 157;  
|- 
|13
|4 Jul 1925 
| Leicestershire  The Town Ground, Burton-on-Trent  
 |bgcolor="#FFCC00"|Drawn
|
| GR Jackson 110; Skelding 5-54; W Bestwick 7-20 
|- 
|14
|11 Jul 1925 
| Leicestershire  Aylestone Road, Leicester 
| style="background:#f00;"|Lost
| 248 runs
| Skelding 5-40; Astill 5-19 
|- 
|15
|15 Jul 1925 
| Glamorgan   Cardiff Arms Park 
| style="background:#f00;"|Lost
| 200 runs
| Ryan 5-19 and 8-41 
|- 
|16
|18 Jul 1925 
| Somerset Clarence Park, Weston-super-Mare  
| style="background:#0f0;"|Won
| 3 wickets
| GM Lee  113; GR Jackson 105 
|- 
|17
|22 Jul 1925 
|  Gloucestershire  Fry's Ground, Bristol  
| style="background:#f00;"|Lost
| Innings and 32 runs
| Parker 5-19 and 6-61 
|- 
|18
|25 Jul 1925 
| Nottinghamshire   Rutland Recreation Ground, Ilkeston  
 |bgcolor="#FFCC00"|Drawn
|
| Whysall 140 
|- 
|19
|29 Jul 1925 
| Essex   County Ground, Derby 
 |bgcolor="#FFCC00"|Drawn
|
| Hipkin 5-44 
|- 
|20
|1 Aug 1925 
| Warwickshire  County Ground, Derby 
 |bgcolor="#FFCC00"|Drawn
|
|  
|- 
|21
| 5 Aug 1925 
| Northamptonshire   County Ground, Northampton 
 |bgcolor="#FFCC00"|Drawn
|
| A Morton 5-89 
|- 
|22
|12 Aug 1925 
| Glamorgan   Queen's Park, Chesterfield 
| style="background:#0f0;"|Won
| 6 wickets
| Ryan 7-70 
|- 
|23
|15 Aug 1925 
| Lancashire   Seed Hill Ground, Nelson  
| style="background:#f00;"|Lost
| 97 runs
| A Morton 7-51 
|- 
|24
|22 Aug 1925 
| Lancashire  Queen's Park, Chesterfield 
| style="background:#f00;"|Lost
| Innings and 132 runs
| R Tyldesley 8-40; Sibbles 5-30 
|-

Statistics

County Championship batting averages

All Derbyshire's first class matches were in the County Championship, and so the above table represents first-class statistics as well.

County Championship bowling averages

All Derbyshire's first class matches were in the County Championship, and so the above table represents first-class statistics as well.

Wicket Keeper

Harry Elliott Catches 41,  Stumping 17 
Jim Hutchinson Catches 12, Stumping 1

See also
Derbyshire County Cricket Club seasons
1925 English cricket season

References

1925 in English cricket
Derbyshire County Cricket Club seasons
English cricket seasons in the 20th century